A service provider (SP) is an organization that provides services, such as consulting, legal, real estate, communications, storage, and processing services, to other organizations. Although a service provider can be a sub-unit of the organization that it serves, it is usually a third-party or outsourced supplier. Examples include telecommunications service providers (TSPs), application service providers (ASPs), storage service providers (SSPs), and internet service providers (ISPs). A more traditional term is service bureau.

IT professionals sometimes differentiate between service providers by categorizing them as type I, II, or III. The three service types are recognized by the IT industry although specifically defined by ITIL and the U.S. Telecommunications Act of 1996.

Type I: internal service provider
Type II: shared service provider
Type III: external service provider

Type III SPs provide IT services to external customers and subsequently can be referred to as external service providers (ESPs) which  range from a full IT organization/service outsource via managed services or MSPs (managed service providers) to limited product feature delivery via ASPs (application service providers).

Types
Application service provider (ASP)
Cloud service provider (CSP) - Software, platform, infrastructure service provider in cloud computing
Network service provider (NSP)
Internet service provider (ISP)
Managed service provider (MSP)
Managed Security Service Provider (MSSP)
Storage service provider (SSP)
Telecommunications service provider (TSP)
SAML service provider
Master managed service provider (MMSP)
Managed Internet service provider (MISP)
Online service provider (OSP)
Payment service provider (PSP)
Cleaning service provider
Gardening service provider
Pest control service provider
Oilfield service provider
Application software service provider in a service-oriented architecture (ASSP)
Cable television service provider

See also
IP address
Service bureau
Service system
Web service
Identity management
SAML 2.0
Identity provider
Connectivity Integrator

References

Further reading

External links

IT service management
Business models
Business terms